Adrian Grant may refer to:

 Adrian Grant (cricketer) (born 1961), Barbadian cricketer
 Adrian Grant (squash player) (born 1980), British professional squash player
 Adrian Grant (writer and producer), British writer and producer